The Marjory Stephenson Prize is the principal prize of the Microbiology Society, awarded for an outstanding contribution of current importance in microbiology.

Marjory Stephenson was the second president of the Microbiology Society (1947 - 1949) and a distinguished pioneer of chemical microbiology.

Recipients
Source: Microbiology Society
1953 Donald Devereux Woods, The Integration of Research on the Nutrition and Metabolism of Micro-organisms
1955 Cornelius Van Niel, Natural Selection in the Microbial World
1957 André Michel Lwoff, The Concept of Virus
1959 G.S. Wilson, Faults and Fallacies in Microbiology
1961 Bert C.J.G. Knight, The Growth of Microbiology
1963 M. Robertson, Some Aspects of the Protozoa and Their Way of Life
1965 Sir Christopher Andrewes, The Troubles of a Virus         	  
1967 Sidney Reuben Elsden, Energy Relations and Fermentations, 1930–1967
1969 Jacques Monod, The Bacterial Cell as a Cybernetic System
1971 Ernest Frederick Gale, Don't Talk to Me about Permeability
1973 Renato Dulbecco, Cell Transformation by Viruses and the Role of Viruses in Cancer
1975 Ephraim Saul Anderson, Push Hard - or How to Promote Resistance
1977 Jean-Marie Ghuysen, The Concept of the Penicillin Target from 1965 until Today
1979 D. Herbert, These Narrow Engines...
1981 Patricia H. Clarke,  Adaptation
1983 Milton R.J. Salton, From Walls to Membranes
1985 Peter Wildy, Little Fleas and Lesser Fleas
1987 David A.J. Tyrrell, The Common Cold - My Favourite Infection
1990 Paul M. Nurse (now Sir Paul), On Fission
1992 John R. Guest, Oxygen-regulated Gene Expression in E. coli
1994 Anthony P.J. (Tony) Trinci, Evolution of the Quorn Myco-protein Fungus Fusarium graminearum
1996 Keith Gull, Oneness and Otherness in Eukaryotic Microbes
1998 Rudolf Thauer, Biochemistry of Methanogenesis
2000 D. W. Holden, In vivo Genetic Analysis of Salmonella Virulence
2002 Stewart Thomas Cole, Comparative and Functional Genomics of Mycobacterium tuberculosis
2004 Stanley Falkow, Thoughts on Persistent Bacterial Infections
2006 Sir John Skehel, Invasion by Influenza Viruses
2008 Alan B. Rickinson, Studies with an Oncogenic Virus: How to Survive a Lifetime with EBV
2010 Jan Tommassen, Assembly of outer membrane proteins in bacteria and mitochondria
2012 Yuan Chang & Patrick S. Moore, Old Themes and New Variations in Human Tumor Virology
2014 Laura Piddock, Understanding the Basis of Antibiotic Resistance as a Platform for Early Drug Discovery
2015 Robin Weiss, What's the host and what's the microbe?
2016 Steve Oliver, Petri plates to Petri nets: the path to systems microbiology
2017 Stephen Busby FRS, Transcription activation in bacteria: ancient and modern
2018 Geoffrey L Smith FRS, Vaccinia virus: a portrait of a poxvirus
2019 Gordon Dougan, Putting Genomics into Action
2021 Martin C. J. Maiden, for translating basic science into practical public health benefits, especially vaccination, and food safety.
2023 Sharon Peacock for applying the sequencing of pathogen genomes to clinical and public health microbiology including of SARS-CoV-2.
				
In 1988, the Marjory Stephenson Memorial Lecture was renamed the Marjory Stephenson Prize Lecture.  Copies of most of these lectures can be found on the Microbiology Society webpage

See also

 List of biology awards

References 
 https://www.microbiologysociety.org/grants-prizes/prize-lectures.html
 https://www.microbiologysociety.org/grants/prize-lectures/marjory-stephenson-prize-lecture.html

Biology awards
British science and technology awards
Awards established in 1953